The Night of the Dub is a 1920 American short silent comedy film, directed by Jack Harvey. It stars Ernest Truex.

References

External links
The Night of the Dub at the Internet Movie Database

1920 films
American silent short films
Silent American comedy films
1920 comedy films
Films directed by Jack Harvey
American black-and-white films
1920 short films
American comedy short films
1920s American films